John James Rankin,  (born 12 March 1957) is a British diplomat and a former ambassador to Nepal. He is the current Governor of the British Virgin Islands. He was Governor of Bermuda from December 2016 to December 2020.

Early life and education
Rankin was born on 12 March 1957. He was educated at Hutchesons' Boys' Grammar School, a private school in Glasgow, Scotland. He studied Scots law at the University of Glasgow, graduating with a first class honours Bachelor of Laws degree. He later studied international law at McGill University, graduating with a Master of Laws degree.

Career

Legal career
Rankin qualified and practised as a solicitor in Scotland; he was a member of the Law Society of Scotland. He was additionally a lecturer in public law at the University of Aberdeen from 1984 to 1988.

Diplomatic career
Rankin joined the Foreign and Commonwealth Office (FCO) in 1988. Between posts at the FCO, he served at the embassy in Dublin and was the consul-general at Boston. He took up his appointment as High Commissioner to Sri Lanka and non-resident High Commissioner to the Maldives in February 2011. In 2015, he was appointed Ambassador to Nepal.

He was appointed Companion of the Order of St Michael and St George (CMG) in the 2016 New Year Honours.

Governor
Rankin was sworn in as Governor of Bermuda on 5 December 2016. In February 2018, signed into law the Domestic Partnership Act 2018, which effectively reversed the right of gay couples to marry. This made Bermuda the first jurisdiction to legalise and then repeal same-sex marriage rights. The law relating to same-sex marriage in Bermuda could change again, as the Supreme Court stated in June 2018 that repealing same-sex marriage rights was discriminatory and thus contrary to section 12 of the Bermudian Constitution.

In September 2020, it was announced that Rankin would be replacing Gus Jaspert as Governor of the British Virgin Islands in 2021. As such, he was replaced in December 2020 by Rena Lalgie as Governor of Bermuda.

Rankin was sworn in as Governor of the British Virgin Islands on 29 January 2021, after arriving in the territory and observing the mandatory 14-day quarantine due to COVID-19.

Personal life
Rankin was married to Lesley Marshall from 1987 until they divorced in 2019. He has a son and two daughters.

Publications
The Right of Self-determination: Its Nature, Content and Beneficiaries in International Law, McGill University, 1984

References

John Rankin, gov.uk
RANKIN, John James, Who's Who 2013, A & C Black, 2013; online edn, Oxford University Press, Dec 2012

1957 births
Living people
People educated at Hutchesons' Grammar School
Alumni of the University of Glasgow
McGill University Faculty of Law alumni
Academics of the University of Aberdeen
High Commissioners of the United Kingdom to Sri Lanka
High Commissioners of the United Kingdom to the Maldives
Ambassadors of the United Kingdom to Nepal
Companions of the Order of St Michael and St George
Governors of Bermuda
Governors of the British Virgin Islands